Young & Sick is the debut self-titled album by artist Young & Sick (Nick Van Hofwegen).

Release
"Young & Sick" was first announced alongside the premiere of the album's first single "Glass" on February 18, 2014. On March 25, the album's second single "Heartache Fetish" was released. The accompanying music video was released May 21.

Young & Sick was officially released April 8, 2014 via Harvest Records. The album was first available as an exclusive stream on Hype Machine.

Critical reception
Young & Sick received universal acclaim from music critics and blogs. AllMusic summarized, stating the album "delivered with so much style and graceful soul that it leaps ahead of the pack to become something of a minor classic of the form."

Pitchfork Media stated "Young & Sick is a remarkably polished debut, with each song boasting careful, painstaking arrangements and adept uses of space. It's charming, undeniable music that bops its way out onto the dance floor with relaxed charm, and it shimmers with the seductive murmur of a lounge staple." Earmilk added the album was "the stuff of music lovers' dreams."

Track listing
All tracks written/produced/recorded by Nick Van Hofwegen.

Personnel
Credits for Young & Sick adapted from AllMusic and from the album liner notes.

Nick Van Hofwegen — Music, Art, Publishing
Idiosyncrasy Gallery - Recorded At
Sam Vloemans - Trumpets on "Gloom"
Aaron Saltzman — Management

Max Braun — Booking
Brent Underwood — Central Bank of Street Cred
Clayton Blaha — Publicity
Nicky Stein - Legal

JB Mondino - Photograph
Caleb Morairty - A&R
Ryan Del Vecchio - A&R Administration

References

2014 debut albums